A libel is a malicious statement in written media, a broadcast, or otherwise published words.

Libel may also refer to:

 Libel (film) (1959), a British drama film
 Libel (poetry), a verse genre primarily of the Renaissance
 Libel (Rychnov nad Kněžnou District), a municipality and village in the Czech Republic 
 Libel (admiralty law), a proceeding in admiralty law

See also 
 Seditious libel, a criminal offence under English common law, related to attacks on the government or the church
 Blasphemous libel, a former common law criminal offence in England and Wales
 Blood libel, sensationalized allegations that a person or group engages in human sacrifice
 Libelle (disambiguation), various meanings
 Wikipedia:Libel, Wikipedia's policy on libel